Trimeresurus sichuanensis (also known as the Sichuan pit viper) is a species of pit viper found in Sichuan, China.

References 

sichuanensis